Geoff Davies may refer to:

 Geoff Davies (bishop) (born 1941), bishop of Umzimvubu
 Geoff Davies (footballer) (born 1947), English professional footballer 
 Geoff Davies (Australian cricketer) (born 1946), Australian cricketer
 Geoffrey Davies (cricketer) (1892–1915), English cricketer
 Geoffrey Davies (born 1942), English actor
 Geoffrey John Davies, founder and CEO of the Violin Channel 
 Geoff Davies (active from 1981), English founder and owner of the record label Probe Plus

See also 
 Jeffrey Davies (disambiguation)
 Geoff Davis (disambiguation)
 Jeff Davis (disambiguation)